The 2009–10 season was Inverness Caledonian Thistle's first in the Scottish First Division since relegation from the Scottish Premier League the previous season.

Scottish First Division

Scottish Cup

Scottish League Cup

Scottish Challenge Cup

Team statistics

League table

Results by round

Hat-tricks

Transfers

References

Inverness Caledonian Thistle F.C. seasons
Inverness Caledonian Thistle